Hülövlü (also, Gyulevle, Gyulevli, and Gyulevlyu) is a village and municipality in the Khachmaz Rayon of Azerbaijan.  It has a population of 1,528.

References 

Populated places in Khachmaz District